Ain't But a Few of Us Left is an album by jazz musicians Milt Jackson and Oscar Peterson, released in 1981.

Track listing
 "Ain't But a Few of Us Left" (Milt Jackson) – 7:26
 "Stuffy" (Coleman Hawkins) – 5:59
 "A Time for Love" (Johnny Mandel, Paul Francis Webster) – 5:57
 "Body and Soul" (Edward Heyman, Robert Sour, Frank Eyton, Johnny Green) – 5:56
 "If I Should Lose You" (Ralph Rainger, Leo Robin) – 8:02
 "What Am I Here For?" (Duke Ellington, Frankie Laine) – 6:20

Personnel
Milt Jackson – vibraphone
Oscar Peterson – piano
Ray Brown – double bass
Grady Tate – drums

References 

1981 albums
Milt Jackson albums
Oscar Peterson albums
Albums produced by Norman Granz
Pablo Records albums